In Euclidean geometry, an isosceles trapezoid (isosceles trapezium in British English) is a convex quadrilateral with a line of symmetry bisecting one pair of opposite sides. It is a special case of a trapezoid. Alternatively, it can be defined as a trapezoid in which both legs and both base angles are of equal measure. Note that a non-rectangular parallelogram is not an isosceles trapezoid because of the second condition, or because it has no line of symmetry. In any isosceles trapezoid, two opposite sides (the bases) are parallel, and the two other sides (the legs) are of equal length (properties shared with the parallelogram). The diagonals are also of equal length. The base angles of an isosceles trapezoid are equal in measure (there are in fact two pairs of equal base angles, where one base angle is the supplementary angle of a base angle at the other base).

Special cases

Rectangles and squares are usually considered to be special cases of isosceles trapezoids though some sources would exclude them.

Another special case is a 3-equal side trapezoid, sometimes known as a trilateral trapezoid or a trisosceles trapezoid. They can also be seen dissected from regular polygons of 5 sides or more as a truncation of 4 sequential vertices.

Self-intersections
Any non-self-crossing quadrilateral with exactly one axis of symmetry must be either an isosceles trapezoid or a kite. However, if crossings are allowed, the set of symmetric quadrilaterals must be expanded to include also the crossed isosceles trapezoids, crossed quadrilaterals in which the crossed sides are of equal length and the other sides are parallel, and the antiparallelograms, crossed quadrilaterals in which opposite sides have equal length.

Every antiparallelogram has an isosceles trapezoid as its convex hull, and may be formed from the diagonals and non-parallel sides (or either pair of opposite sides in the case of a rectangle) of an isosceles trapezoid.

Characterizations
If a quadrilateral is known to be a trapezoid, it is not sufficient just to check that the legs have the same length in order to know that it is an isosceles trapezoid, since a rhombus is a special case of a trapezoid with legs of equal length, but is not an isosceles trapezoid as it lacks a line of symmetry through the midpoints of opposite sides.

Any one of the following properties distinguishes an isosceles trapezoid from other trapezoids:
The diagonals have the same length.
The base angles have the same measure.
The segment that joins the midpoints of the parallel sides is perpendicular to them.
Opposite angles are supplementary, which in turn implies that isosceles trapezoids are cyclic quadrilaterals.
The diagonals divide each other into segments with lengths that are pairwise equal; in terms of the picture below,  (and  if one wishes to exclude rectangles).

Angles
In an isosceles trapezoid, the base angles have the same measure pairwise. In the picture below, angles ∠ABC and ∠DCB are obtuse angles of the same measure, while angles ∠BAD and ∠CDA are acute angles, also of the same measure.

Since the lines AD and BC are parallel, angles adjacent to opposite bases are supplementary, that is, angles

Diagonals and height

The diagonals of an isosceles trapezoid have the same length; that is, every isosceles trapezoid is an equidiagonal quadrilateral. Moreover, the diagonals divide each other in the same proportions. As pictured, the diagonals AC and BD have the same length and divide each other into segments of the same length ( and ).

The ratio in which each diagonal is divided is equal to the ratio of the lengths of the parallel sides that they intersect, that is,

The length of each diagonal is, according to Ptolemy's theorem, given by

where a and b are the lengths of the parallel sides AD and BC, and c is the length of each leg AB and CD.

The height is, according to the Pythagorean theorem, given by

The distance from point E to base AD is given by

where a and b are the lengths of the parallel sides AD and BC, and h is the height of the trapezoid.

Area
The area of an isosceles (or any) trapezoid is equal to the average of the lengths of the base and top (the parallel sides) times the height.

If instead of the height of the trapezoid, the common length of the legs AB =CD = c is known, then the area can be computed using Brahmagupta's formula for the area of a cyclic quadrilateral, which with two sides equal simplifies to

-where  is the semi-perimeter of the trapezoid. This formula is analogous to Heron's formula to compute the area of a triangle. The previous formula for area can also be written as

Circumradius
The radius in the circumscribed circle is given by

See also

Isosceles tangential trapezoid

References

External links
Some engineering formulas involving isosceles trapezoids

Types of quadrilaterals